David Paul Landa, QC (29 May 194124 November 1984) was an Australian politician. In public life, he was called "Paul Landa".  He was a Labor member of the New South Wales Legislative Council from 1973 to 1984, and the member for Peats in the New South Wales Legislative Assembly in 1984. He was a government minister from 1976 to 1984.

Landa was born in St Peters in Sydney to Maurice and Fay Landa, who were of Irish/Polish descent and had migrated from Belfast. He was educated at Kogarah High School and Sydney Boys' High School in 1956–58, before studying for a Bachelor of Laws at the University of Sydney. He became a solicitor in 1964 and was admitted to the bar in 1974. On 17 December 1968, he married Annika. He was Jewish.  He was the nephew of Abe Landa, who was also a NSW Government Minister.

In 1973, Landa was elected to the New South Wales Legislative Council as a Labor member. He became Minister for Industrial Relations in 1976, although later that year he became the Minister for Planning and Environment and became Vice-President of the Executive Council. In that year he also became the Government's Leader in the Upper House. He became Education Minister in 1980, Energy Minister in 1981 and Attorney General in 1983. In 1984, he transferred to the lower house, winning the seat of Peats.

Paul Landa was Minister for the Environment in 1979 when he and the majority of NSW Cabinet Members travelled to Terania Creek in northern NSW to investigate the reasons behind the presence of around 300 protesters, and 100 police, at Terania Creek. The protesters were stopping logging from taking place within the Terania Creek rainforest. While Landa was fully supportive of the preservation of the rainforest and the stopping of logging it was his cabinet colleague Frank Walker who had brought the matter to the Government's attention. After visiting Terania Creek themselves the Cabinet Members agreed that the Environmental Impact Study that the protesters were wanting would be carried out. The logging was stopped and never recommenced.

When he became Minister for Education in 1980 Paul Landa distributed native trees to schools to enable the planting of native tree groves, including rainforest groves, in school grounds as a means of providing hands on environmental education to school children. At a time when protecting the environment was seen as radical, controversial and largely unnecessary Paul Landa was a leader in environmental protection and education. Much of his legacy, following his death, was carried on by Bob Carr as Minister for the Environment from 1984 to 1988.

He was generally seen as an outstanding politician who was probably destined for the party leadership, but later that year he died at Vaucluse, while playing tennis. It is believed he suffered a heart attack. He was 43.

Legacy
There is a public foreshore park in Pearl Beach (Gosford City, NSW), called "Paul Landa Reserve", dedicated to Paul Landa's service.

Since 2004, the David Paul Landa Memorial Scholarship for Pianists has been awarded to a piano finalist in the Symphony Australia Young Performers Awards. The scholarship provides the winner with concert engagements with the Sydney Symphony Orchestra and Musica Viva Australia, and a cash prize to enable overseas study.

References

|-

|-

|-

|-

1941 births
1984 deaths
Members of the New South Wales Legislative Assembly
Jewish Australian politicians
Australian Labor Party members of the Parliament of New South Wales
20th-century Australian politicians
Attorneys General of New South Wales